Paul Gerard Lynch, an Australian politician, is a member of the New South Wales Legislative Assembly representing Liverpool since 1995 for the Labor Party.

Early career and background
Lynch graduated with a Bachelor of Arts (Hons) and a LLB and was elected as a Councillor on Liverpool City Council in 1987 until his election to NSW Parliament in 1995. During this period he served as Deputy Mayor and served on the Western Suburbs Regional Organisation of Councils. Lynch originally ran for Labor Party preselection for Liverpool in 1989, but was defeated by Peter Anderson. A prominent member of the party's left-wing faction, Lynch gained his revenge on the right-wing Anderson when Anderson failed to cement support amongst his local party members and lost party pre-selection.

He is the brother in-law of former federal members of parliament Laurie Ferguson and Martin Ferguson.

Parliamentary career
Elected to NSW Parliament in 1995, he was Temporary Chairman of Committees and Chair of the Committee on the Office of the Ombudsman and Police Integrity Commission. Lynch was re-elected on 24 March 2007 and was appointed Minister for Local Government, Minister for Aboriginal Affairs and Minister Assisting the Minister for Health (Mental Health) in the Iemma ministry. With the appointment of Nathan Rees as premier, he became the Minister for Ageing, Minister for Disability Services and Minister for Aboriginal Affairs. In the Keneally ministry, Lynch retained the Aboriginal Affairs portfolio, and took on responsibility for Industrial Relations, Commerce, Energy, and Public Sector Reform.

Following the 2015 state election, Lynch holds the shadow portfolio of Attorney General.

References

 

20th-century Australian lawyers
20th-century Australian politicians
21st-century Australian politicians
Year of birth missing (living people)
Living people
Labor Left politicians
Members of the New South Wales Legislative Assembly
Australian Labor Party members of the Parliament of New South Wales
Australian solicitors
New South Wales local councillors